McGorman is a surname. It is an Anglicised form of the Gaelic Mac Gormáin, meaning "son of Gormán". The personal name Gormán is derived from the diminutive of gorm, meaning "dark blue", "noble".

People
Jim McGorman, American musician.

Related surnames
Gorman, O'Gorman.

References